François Hamelin (born 18 December 1986) is a Canadian former short track speed skater from Sainte-Julie, Quebec, residing in Montreal. He is the younger brother of acclaimed Canadian short tracker Charles Hamelin.  His father Yves Hamelin is also the director of the Canadian short track program.

Career
While not having nearly the same amount of success of his older brother, Hamelin has had success at the junior level in international competition. He joined the Canadian national senior team for the 2007–08 season. Hamelin has been an important part of the Canadian short track team helping them to both a silver at the 2008 World Championships, and a silver at the 2008 World Team Championships. During the 2010 Winter Olympics in Vancouver, François skated with his brother in the 1000m short track final, only to place 5th. On 26 February, he won a gold medal in the 5000 m relay along with his brother Charles, François-Louis Tremblay, Olivier Jean and Guillaume Bastille. He also took a silver in the 500 m at the 2010 Worlds, and was part of the Canadian team which won the gold in the 5000 m relay at the 2011 World Championships. He took a total of 48 medals in international competition.

2014 Olympics
In the Sochi 2014 Olympics, he finished 9th in the 1500m and 6th as part of the 5000m relay team.

2018 Olympics
In August 2017, Hamelin was named to Canada's 2018 Winter Olympics team.

In June 2018, Hamelin announced his retirement from competition, having launched his own athlete management agency, Balboa Sports.

References

External links
 Canadian Speed Skating Profile

1986 births
Living people
Canadian male short track speed skaters
Olympic short track speed skaters of Canada
Olympic gold medalists for Canada
Olympic medalists in short track speed skating
Short track speed skaters at the 2010 Winter Olympics
Short track speed skaters at the 2014 Winter Olympics
Medalists at the 2010 Winter Olympics
People from Lévis, Quebec
People from Sainte-Julie, Quebec
Sportspeople from Quebec
21st-century Canadian people